Johannes Bohn (20 July 1640 – 19 December 1718) was a German physician who was a native of Leipzig.

He studied medicine at the University of Leipzig and the University of Jena, and received his doctorate in 1665. In 1691 he was appointed city physician, and in 1691 professor of therapeutics. He later held the office of rector at the University of Leipzig (1693–94).

Bohn was known for his pioneer work as a medical-legal officer in forensic medicine. He introduced the policy of thorough autopsies of the deceased, and specialized in the investigation of lethal wounds. He also did early research concerning the physiology of the circulatory system.

Many of Bohn's scientific writings were burned prior to his death, as stipulated in his will. Two of his important medical works that survived are:
 *  (1689): a medical-legal treatise in which he analyzes the distinction between purposeful and accidental fatal wounds.
 *  (1710): a series of lectures on respiration, circulation, the digestive process, fetal development, et al.

Principal works 

  (Leipzig, 1675).
  (Leipzig, 1685).
  (Leipzig, 1678).
  (Leipzig, 1689).
  (Leipzig, 1683).
  (Leipzig, 1680).
  (Leipzig, 1689).
  (Leipzig, 1689).

References

External links 
 Bohadin at The General biographical dictionary (London 1812), pp. 519–520.]
 François-Xavier Feller, Dictionnaire historique, p. 366.

1640 births
1718 deaths
17th-century German physicians
18th-century German physicians
Academic staff of Leipzig University
Rectors of Leipzig University
Physicians from Leipzig
17th-century German writers
17th-century German male writers